Laurynas Grigelis and Zdeněk Kolář were the defending champions but chose not to defend their title.

Sander Gillé and Joran Vliegen won the title after defeating Filip Polášek and Patrik Rikl 6–3, 6–4 in the final.

Seeds

Draw

References
 Main Draw

Svijany Open - Doubles
2018 Doubles